Juncheng Wei  (born 1968) is a Chinese mathematician working in the area of nonlinear partial differential equations, nonlinear analysis and mathematical biology. Since 1994, he has over 470 published articles in top journals, including Annals of Mathematics, Inventiones Mathematicae, Communications on Pure and Applied Mathematics, and Duke Mathematical Journal.

Juncheng Wei lived in Hong Kong with his wife and two children, Andrew and Sophia, until August 2013.

He is now a Professor of Mathematics and a Canada Research Chair (Tier I) at the University of British Columbia. He received a Silver Morningside Medal in 2010, and was an invited speaker at the 2014 International Congress of Mathematicians. 
In 2019, Juncheng Wei was elected a Fellow of the Royal Society of Canada . 
In 2020, he was awarded the CMS Jeffery–Williams Prize and Simons Fellow in Mathematics.

, Juncheng Wei's scholarly work has been cited over 18,000 times and has an h-index 69.

References

1968 births
Academic staff of the Chinese University of Hong Kong
Chinese expatriates in Canada
Chinese expatriates in Hong Kong
Living people
People from Tianmen
Academic staff of the University of British Columbia
Mathematicians from Hubei
Educators from Hubei